The American Council for Technology (ACT) and Industry Advisory Council (IAC) is a non-profit public-private partnership dedicated to improving government through the application of information technology. ACT-IAC provides a forum where government and industry exchange information and collaborate on technology issues in the public sector.  

Established in 1979 as the Federation of Government Information Processing Councils (FGIPC), the ACT mission is to assist government in using information technology to improve government operations and serve the public. Governed by a board of directors composed of government executives, ACT provides a forum for government employees to collaborate on high-priority IT issues. In 1989 ACT established the Industry Advisory Council (IAC) to bring the private sector IT industry into this unique collaborative forum.

ACT-IAC sponsors two major events each year, the 30-year-old Management of Change Conference (MOC) and the 20-year-old Executive Leadership Conference (ELC).  Other events include the three-year-old Small Business Conference (SBC) and the decades-old High Performance Computing Conference. 

There is a broad spectrum of [industry members](http://www.actiac.org/industry-members) including Esri, Booz Allen Hamilton, Deloitte, Ernst & Young, CivicActions, Mitre Corporation, McKinsey & Company, Microsoft, Gartner, and many more.

References

External links

Trade associations based in the United States
American advisory organizations
Technology trade associations